The following lists events that happened during 1990 in Sri Lanka.

Incumbents
President: Ranasinghe Premadasa
Prime Minister: Dingiri Banda Wijetunga 
Chief Justice: Parinda Ranasinghe

Governors
 Central Province – E. L. B. Hurulle (until 1 February); P. C. Imbulana (starting 1 February)
 North Central Province – E. L. Senanayake
 North Eastern Province – Nalin Seneviratne 
 North Western Province – Karunasena Kodituwakku 
 Sabaragamuwa Province – C. N. Saliya Mathew
 Southern Province – Leslie Mervyn Jayaratne
 Uva Province – P. C. Imbulana (until January); Tilak Ratnayake (starting February)
 Western Province – Suppiah Sharvananda

Chief Ministers
 Central Province – W. M. P. B. Dissanayake 
 North Central Province – G. D. Mahindasoma 
 North Eastern Province – Varatharaja Perumal (until 10 March) 
 North Western Province – Gamini Jayawickrama Perera 
 Sabaragamuwa Province – Abeyratne Pilapitiya 
 Southern Province – M. S. Amarasiri 
 Uva Province – Percy Samaraweera
 Western Province – Susil Moonesinghe

Events
 On 11 June 1990, members of the Sinhalese officers, were responsible for the killing of over 600 unarmed Tamil civilians along with members of the LTTE in Northern Province, Sri Lanka.
 On 20 June 1990, the town of Kalmunai was allegedly subjected to intense shelling by the Army. As a result, the LTTE withdrew from the town. Subsequently, once the Army had occupied the town, the massacre of civilians began. The UTHR said that the number of people who were killed or disappeared by the Sri Lankan Army was in excess of 1,000 and alleged that over 250 were killed.  
 Eelam war 2 begins following the attack the Sri Lankan government placed an embargo on food and medicine entering the Jaffna peninsula and the air force relentlessly bombed LTTE targets in the area. The LTTE responded by attacking Sinhalese army camps.

Notes 

a.  Gunaratna, Rohan. (1998). Pg.353, Sri Lanka's Ethnic Crisis and National Security, Colombo: South Asian Network on Conflict Research.

References